VIA Gra, known outside of Ukraine and other nearby countries as Nu Virgos, is a Ukrainian girl group. The name VIA Gra is a triple wordplay; it is an allusion to the drug Viagra, the first three letters "ВИА" ("VIA") also stand for "vocal-instrumental ensemble" in Ukrainian, and "Гра" ("hra") means "game" or "play" in Ukrainian, and is also a kind of signature of the surnames of the two first girls of the group, VI-nnytsk-A and GR-anovsk-A, the originally used maiden name of Nadia Meiher. Nu Virgos rose to prominence when they hit the charts in Ukraine and Russia in September 2000, with their first single "Popytka No. 5" ("Attempt No. 5").            
Their first success outside the Russian language area was in May 2004, with the single "Stop! Stop! Stop!", an English version of their 2002 Russian song. The group is known for their frequent lineup changes, with 13 different individuals having at one time been in the group. The group was co-created by Dmitriy Kostyuk and Konstantin Meladze. Kostyuk is the manager of the group and the co-producer of the group's albums. Meladze is the writer of the group's songs and the co-producer of the group's albums.

History

2000—2002: Early years 
In 2000, "Popytka No. 5" with Alena Vinnitskaya and Nadezhda Granovskaya, was released, with "Obnimi menya" ("Hold Me Closer"), "Bomba" (Bomb), "Ya ne vernus" ("I Won't Be Back") following after. By the end of the year, Nu Virgos' repertoire comprised of seven songs, which was enough to embark on a tour. The group's first live performance took place in Dnipropetrovsk, on the stage of the city's Ledoviy Palace in front of 4,000 spectators. The group's management then decided to release the first full-length album; Popytka No. 5.

In 2001, Nu Virgos received some of their first awards; “A Hundred Pood Hit” from HIT FM Radio, “Golden Gramophone” from Russian Radio, and the “Golden Firebird” prize at the Ukrainian annual festival "Tavriyski Igry”.

In 2002, Granovskaya became pregnant and left temporarily to give birth, in which Natiana Naynik took her place. Upon Granovskaya's leave, the producers decided to expand the group by adding another member. Therefore, the group became a trio instead of a duet, with the addition of Anna Sedokova, along with a change in their musical direction. In the spring of 2002, the group released their new single; "Stop! Stop! Stop!", with the success of the song enabling Nu Virgos to take part in the "Ovation" Music Award Ceremony held at the Moscow's State Central Concert Hall "Rossiya". They released the music video for the song the following summer. In September, the song “Good morning, papa!” and its accompanying music video was released, upon which time Granovskaya had returned, and for the first and only time, four girls were present in the group. At this time, Vinnitskaya felt that her time at the group had come to an end, and so left. Additionally, Naynik also left Nu Virgos, after the producers of the music video came to the conclusion that two brunettes did not belong in the same group. To close that year's end, the group's members played the roles of foreign princesses in a TV musical called "Zolushka" (Cinderella).

2003—2005: "Golden" Era 
By early 2003, Vera Brezhneva had been cast as the new member of the group, and thus began the "golden" era of Nu Virgos. The group was made up of what was considered the "golden" group of soloists; Nadia Meiher, Vera Brezhneva, and Anna Sedokova. In the beginning of 2003, Nu Virgos released "Ne ostavlyay menya, lyubimiy" (“Don’t Leave Me, Beloved”), complete with an eponymously titled video tape containing a collection of Nu Virgos' songs. They released Stop! Snyato! (Stop! That's a wrap!), which included five new songs along with seven remixes. They attended the Russian MUZ TV Awards, in which they won the “Soundtrack” award. In May, the group released the music video for the song "Ubey moyu podrugu" ("Kill My Girlfriend"). By the end of 2003, having completed their new album Biologiya (Biology), they entered the international music scene. Their first English-language album Stop! Stop! Stop! saw popularity in Israel, Japan, Taiwan, Thailand, Indonesia and Scandinavian countries. The songs "Okean i tri reki" ("Ocean and Three Rivers") and "Prityazhenya bolshe net" ("No Attraction Anymore"), both in collaboration with singer Valeriy Meladze, were also released. This was shortly followed by "Biologiya", with the last two music videos releasing in 2004. In the summer of 2004, Nu Virgos were awarded with the Russian music award "MUZ TV 2004" and completed a world tour spanning territories including South East Asia, Israel and America. In November, the group released two more songs; "Mir, o kotorom ja ne znala do tebya" and English version of the song; "Take You Back".

In 2004, Sedokova became pregnant, and left the group. She was replaced shortly after, only for a few months, by Svetlana Loboda, who had starred in the video for "Biologiya" alongside Meiher and Brezhneva. Loboda's short and turbulent career in Nu Virgos led her to part ways with the group, as fans were appalled by her behaviour during live performances and disappointed that she was replacing Sedokova. After Loboda, Albina Dzhanabaeva appeared as the new member of the group. The year 2005 marked the release of the Russian version of Nu Virgos' official website, as well as the release of three new music videos; "Net nichego khuzhe", "I Don’t Want A Man" (English version of "Net nichego khuzhe") and "Brillianty" ("Diamonds"). Additionally, the group picked up the MUZ TV's "The Best Pop Act" award for the second year in a row.

2006—2012: Final years 
In January 2006, Nu Virgos were a participant at MIDEM 2006. Despite the heavy touring that year, the group released four more music videos; "Obmani no ostansya" ("Lie, but Stay"), "L.M.L." (Russian and English), and "Tsvetok i nozh" ("Flower and Knife") while also completing a new English album, their second after Stop! Stop! Stop!. A second English-language album L.M.L. was scheduled for release in November 2006. In early April of 2007, Koryahina left the group due to a pregnancy, and so the label decided to release the English album project digitally. In July 2007, Brezhneva left the group after she married Mikhail Kiperman, and then went on to host the Russian version of Power of 10 a year later. In May 2007, Nu Virgos won "Best Group" at the MUZ TV Awards for the second time. On 5 September, Nu Virgos released the music video for the song "Potselui" ("Kisses") in Ukraine, and on 10 September in Russia. On 1 November 2007, the group released a new compilation album called Potselui (Kisses) featuring 19 tracks. In November, Nu Virgos appeared on the cover of the Russian edition of the male magazine Maxim. In December 2007, the group recorded a new song called "Ya ne boyus'" ("I'm Not Afraid").

In 2008, the group was scheduled to tour for the album L.M.L. in variety of countries such as Japan, Germany, and the United Kingdom. The group released a new video in February 2008. In March, Miss Russia 2006, Tatiana Kotova, joined Nu Virgos. In June 2008, Nu Virgos won the award for "Best Group" and "Best Video" for Potseluy for the forth time at the MUZ TV Awards. In August, their new single "My Emancipation" was released with an accompanying music video. In November, they finished filming a music video for song "Amerikanskaya zhena" ("American Wife"), which was a part of the official soundtrack for the Russian film Stilyagi. In the beginning of 2009, Bagaudinova left the group and her position was filled by the returning Nadya Meiher. The group released a new single, along with a music video entitled "Anti-Geisha". In the autumn of 2009, the group released a new single; "Sumasshedshiy" ("Crazy"). The music video was released in September.

In March 2010, Kotova left the group and was replaced by Yeva Bushmina. In April, a new song and music video were released; "Poshel von" ("Get Out"). In September, "Den' bez tebya" ("A Day Without You") was also released. In April 2011, Dmitriy Kostyuk resigned as the group's general producer. In November 2011, Meiher, pregnant once again, left the group and was replaced by Santa Dimopulos. In February 2012, the music video for "Allo, mam!" ("Hello, Mom!") was released. In September 2012, Santa Dimopulos decided to leave the group, after recording just one single. A month later, it was announced that the group has been placed on hiatus, with no confirmation regarding when they would return and with which members. In December 2012, Konstantin Meladze announced during a press conference that Nu Virgos would cease to exist by January 2013, citing that the group had outlived itself in the format that it was performing in at the given time.

2013—2018: Rebirth 
Despite initial claims that Nu Virgos would no longer exist as a group, at the beginning of 2013 Meladze announced a casting for his new show; Хочу V ВИА Гру (Khochu V Vya Hru; I want to be in VIA Gra). The casting was formatted as a reality TV show, consisting of eight episodes, in which by the end, three new soloists were chosen by popular vote; Erika Herceg, Anastasia Kozhevnikova and Misha Romanova. In November 2013, they released their new single and music video entitled "Peremiriye" ("Truce"). Meanwhile, during Meladze's casting show, Kostyuk, the ex-general producer of Nu Virgos, announced his own new lineup. In autumn of 2013, he presented his version of Nu Virgos, which consisted of Darya Rostova, Darya Medovaya and Aina Vilberg. At a show in Kyiv, they performed singles from their new album Magiya (Magic). This caused further tensions between Meladze and Kostuyk, who were already at odds with each other since the dissolution of the old Nu Virgos. In May 2014, the new Nu Virgos released their second single "U menya poyavilsya drugoy" ("I've Got Another Man"), featuring Georgian rapper Vakhtang. In 2014, the group was criticized in Ukraine for having accepted awards in Russia, while many Ukrainians believed their country was a victim of Russian aggression. In November 2014, Nu Virgos were featured on a new single released by Russian rapper Mot, titled "Kislorod" ("Oxygen").

In March 2015, Nu Virgos released their new solo single, "Eto bylo prekrasno" ("It's Been Great"). The song was well received, but critics panned the single, citing that the song sounded relatively similar to many of the group's previous works, including "Obmani, no ostan'sya" ("Lie, but Stay") and "Ya ne boyus'" (I'm Not Afraid"). In July 2015, they released a new compilation album called Vsё luchsheye v odnom (All The Best In One), which featured the most popular Nu Virgos songs throughout the group's history. In November, the group released a new single "Tak sil'no" ("So Much"). They performed this song, along with a medley of previous Nu Virgos' songs; "LML", "U menya poyavilsya drugoy" ("I've Got Another Man"), "Peremiriye" ("Truce") and "Sumasshedshiy" ("Crazy"), at the Big Love Show on 15 February 2016. In November 2016, the group released a new single entitled "Kto ty mne?" ("Who Are You to Me?"). As all other songs released by the group, the music and lyrics were written by the group's producer, Meladze. On October 18, 2017, the single "Moyo serdtse zanyato" ("My Heart is Busy") was released on Love Radio. The official music video for the single was released on 19 November.

On 24 March 2018, at a concert in Tbilisi, the group performed in a new lineup; Anastasia Kozhevnikova, Erika Herceg and Olga Meganskaya. Meganskaya, a singer from St. Petersburg, replaced Misha Romanova, whose maternity leave became known two days before the concert. 

On 24 August 2018, Kozhevnikova got married. During the wedding, she announced that her contract with the group would be ending on 2 September. She stated that she had chosen not to renew the contract due to wanting to pursue a solo career. However, even after the end of the contract, and before the announcement of a new member, the group continued to perform in the old lineup.

2018—present: New lineups, singles and hiatus 
On 15 September, the group performed at the Agalarov Estate Club in a renewed lineup with Ulyana Sinetskaya. On 5 October, they released a new single "Ya polyubila monstra" ("I Loved A Monster"), and on 12 November, the music video for the song was released.

On 5 September 2019, the song entitled "Lyubol" ("Love") premiered on the Meladze Music YouTube channel and on 9 October, they released the music video for the song. On 6 December, the group released the song "1+1" along with a music video.

On 14 May 2020, Herceg announced on her Instagram account that she was leaving the group in December and starting a solo career. In September, she left the band. On 16 October, Meganskaya announced that she was also leaving the group.

On 22 October, a new single "Rikoshet" ("Ricochet") premiered on a local radio station Love Radio. On  6 November, an updated lineup was revealed at the Evening Urgant show. Sinetskaya was joined by the new members of the group; Ksenia Popova and Sofia Tarasova.

On 27 November, the music video for the song "Rikoshet" was released, but it received bad reviews from the viewers.

On 28 January 2021, the re-release of "Anti-Geisha" was released. On 16 April, the group released a new song; "Rodnikovaya Voda" ("Spring Water"). On 15 October, they released the song "Maneken" ("Mannequin"), to which the music video was released on 8 December. 

Because of the 2022 Russian invasion of Ukraine, the group went on an indefinite hiatus.

Notes

Members

Timeline

Discography

Popytka No. 5 (2001)
Stop! Snyato! (2003)
Biologiya (2003)
Stop! Stop! Stop! (2004)
L.M.L. (2007)

References

External links
Nu Virgos at iTunes

 
Musical groups established in 2000
Ukrainian pop music groups
Ukrainian girl groups
English-language singers from Ukraine
Russian dance musicians
Russian girl groups
Articles which contain graphical timelines
Vocal trios
Winners of the Golden Gramophone Award